The oil battle was an economic battle announced by the government of Argentine president Arturo Frondizi on 24 July 1958. The aim of the "battle" was to achieve self-sufficiency in oil production. It is remembered for the ideological controversy caused by the apparent ideological about-face of the president, who had previously been critical of oil policy.

See also

 Italian economic battles

1958 in Argentina
Economic history of Argentina
YPF